Stadion Pod Borićima is a multi-purpose stadium in Bihać, Bosnia and Herzegovina.  It is currently used mostly for football matches and is the home ground of NK Jedinstvo Bihać. The stadium can hold about 7,500 spectators.

References

External links
Stadion Pod Borićima at rekreacija.ba

NK Jedinstvo Bihać
Buildings and structures in Bihać
Football venues in Bosnia and Herzegovina
Multi-purpose stadiums in Bosnia and Herzegovina